The Mission House at Kerikeri in New Zealand was completed in 1822 as part of the Kerikeri Mission Station by the Church Missionary Society, and is New Zealand's oldest surviving building.  It is sometimes known as Kemp House.

Samuel Marsden established the Anglican mission to New Zealand with lay preachers, who lived in the Bay of Islands under the protection of Hongi Hika, the chief of the local tribe, the Ngāpuhi.  In November 1819, Marsden purchased 13,000 acres (53 km2) from the Ngapuhi.

Marsden instructed the Reverend John Butler to erect buildings for the mission station under the shelter of the Ngapuhi Pa or fortress of Kororipo at Kerikeri, (Marsden, himself, Thomas Kendall and Hongi Hika left for Britain).  Using Māori and skilled European labour, Butler had completed the centre piece Mission House by 1822, (despite being interrupted by the return of Kendall and Hongi Hika with a thousand muskets, and Kororipo being used as a base for the subsequent Ngapuhi military campaign in the Musket Wars).  

Butler's house was a weatherboard clad, two-storey Georgian design with a verandah and two chimneys.  It was built primarily from Kauri.  At some point in the 1830s, a skilling was added, and the verandah was replaced with an enlarged design in 1843.  In the 1920s a bathroom was added behind the kitchen.

Butler was sacked in 1823, and George Clarke occupied the building until the early 1830s, by which time the Ngapuhi had abandoned Kororipo, but the mission station was strong enough to feel no need for protection.

The house was occupied by James and Charlotte Kemp in 1832 and although initially part of an expanded mission presence, (including the Stone Store), it was later purchased by the Kemps, and stayed in that family for 142 years, until Ernest Kemp donated it to the New Zealand Historic Places Trust (since renamed to Heritage New Zealand) in 1974.

Mission House was added to the New Zealand Historic Places Category 1 list on 23 June 1983.

The Trust has restored the building to an approximation of its 1843 appearance, (although the verandah was higher, and the roof was not shingled).  Together with the Stone Store, the Mission house is now a museum open to the public.

References

Houses in New Zealand
Museums in the Northland Region
Far North District
Heritage New Zealand Category 1 historic places in the Northland Region
History of New Zealand
Historic house museums in New Zealand
European-New Zealand culture
Bay of Islands
Residential buildings completed in 1822
1820s architecture in New Zealand
1822 in New Zealand
Wooden buildings and structures in New Zealand
1822 establishments in New Zealand
Historic homes in New Zealand
Religious buildings and structures in the Northland Region